Vladyslav Andriyovych Vanat (born 4 January 2002) is a Ukrainian professional footballer who plays as a striker for Dynamo Kyiv.

Career

Early career
Born in Kamianets-Podilskyi, Vanat is a product of the DYuSSh-2 Kamianets-Podilskyi and FC Dynamo Kyiv academy systems.

Dynamo Kyiv
He made his debut in the Ukrainian Premier League for Dynamo on 9 May 2021 against Kolos Kovalivka.

Loan to Chornomorets Odesa
In July 2021, he moved on loan to Chornomorets Odesa for the 2021 season.
On 25 July, he made his league debut against Desna Chernihiv at the Chernihiv Stadium.

Honours
Dynamo Kyiv
 Ukrainian Premier League: 2020–21

References

External links
 
 

2002 births
Living people
People from Kamianets-Podilskyi
Ukrainian footballers
Association football forwards
Ukraine youth international footballers
Ukraine under-21 international footballers
FC Dynamo Kyiv players
FC Chornomorets Odesa players
Ukrainian Premier League players
Sportspeople from Khmelnytskyi Oblast